The 1935 Masters Tournament was the second Masters Tournament, then still known as the "Augusta National Invitation Tournament," held April 4–8 at Augusta National Golf Club in Augusta, Georgia.

In a change from the first year, the nines were switched to their present order, with the finishing hole at "Holly." In the fourth round, Gene Sarazen holed a double eagle (235 yards, 4 wood) to tie Craig Wood and force a 36-hole playoff. This second shot at "Firethorn," the par-5 15th hole, then , is referred to in golf as the "shot heard 'round the world."

Sarazen won the Monday playoff by five strokes, even-par 144 to 149 (+5), and parred the 15th hole in both rounds. Tournament co-founder and host Bobby Jones finished at 297, fifteen strokes back in a tie for 25th place. The purse was $5,000 and the winner's share was $1,500.

Course

Past champion in the field

The Masters did not have a 36-hole cut until 1957

Round summaries

First round
Thursday, April 4, 1935

Second round
Friday, April 5, 1935

Third round
Saturday, April 6, 1935

Final round
Sunday, April 7, 1935

Source:

Scorecard
Final round

Cumulative tournament scores, relative to par
{|class="wikitable" span = 50 style="font-size:85%;
|-
|style="background: Orange;" width=10|
|Double Eagle
|style="background: Red;" width=10|
|Eagle
|style="background: Pink;" width=10|
|Birdie
|style="background: PaleGreen;" width=10|
|Bogey
|style="background: Green;" width=10|
|Double bogey
|}
Source:

Playoff 
Monday, April 8, 1935

Scorecards
Morning round

Afternoon round

Cumulative playoff scores, relative to par
Source:

References

External links
Masters.com – past winners and results
GolfCompendium.com: 1935 Masters
Augusta.com – 1935 Masters leaderboard and earnings

1935
1935 in golf
1935 in American sports
1935 in sports in Georgia (U.S. state)
April 1935 sports events